Didacus may refer to: 

 Didacus of Alcalá
 Didacus Ximenes
 Didacus Jules

See also
Diego